HMS Juniper was launched at Bermuda in 1809 for the British Royal Navy. She participated in one campaign for which her crew was awarded the Naval General Service Medal (1847) with clasp "San Sebastian". She also participated in the capture of several merchant ships. The  Navy sold her in 1814.

Career
Lieutenant Nathaniel Vassall commissioned Juniper at Halifax in 1809. 

On 27 October 1809 Juniper sent into Bermuda the American brig Sukey, Osgood, master. Sukey had been sailing from Sumatra to Salem.

On 15 July 1812  and Juniper captured the brig Start. Start, of 173 tons (bm), P.Hazelton, master, had been sailing from St Ubes to Newburyport, Massachusetts with a cargo of salt.

On 6 July Juniper captured the American vessel Friendship. Lloyd's List reported that the Juniper cutter had detained Friendship, Wood, master, on 22 July. Juniper removed $20,000 of goods and permitted Friendship to proceed on to Boston.

One of the vessels, Elizabeth, Holt, master, immediately developed a leak and next morning turned back for Rio. Before evening, the  captured her and on 17 January 1813 took her into Rio. An American master and prize crew sailed Elizabeth out on 5 February and burnt her under Fort Santa Cruz, at the entrance of Rio de Janeiro, in Guanabara Bay.

Juniper underwent repairs at Portsmouth in May-July 1813.

Juniper, Beagle, and  participated in the Siege of San Sebastián (7 July - 8 September 1813) as part of the fleet under Captain George Collier assigned to help Sir Arthur Wellesley's campaigns in Portugal and Spain. In 1847 the Admiralty authorized the issuance of the Naval General service Medal with clasp "St. Sebastian" to surviving participants in the campaign.

Disposal
The "Principal Officers and Commissioners of His Majesty's Navy" offered the Jupiter schooner, of 159 tons", 
for sale on 4 November. She sold on that date for £400.

Post-script
On 30 August 1817 Diadem, Wells, master, was on her way from Jamaica to Saint John, New Brunswick, when two vessels stopped her and boarded her. The two were the brigantine Mexican Congress, under the independent flag, the schooner Juniper, under the Venezuelan flag.

Notes

Citations

References
  
 

Shamrock-class schooners
1809 ships
Ships built in  Bermuda
Schooners of the Royal Navy